The Young Turk Revolution (July 1908) was a constitutionalist revolution in the Ottoman Empire. The Committee of Union and Progress (CUP), an organization of the Young Turks movement, forced Sultan Abdul Hamid II to restore the Ottoman Constitution and recall the parliament, which ushered in multi-party politics within the Empire. From the Young Turk Revolution to the Empire's end marks the Second Constitutional Era of the Ottoman Empire's history. More than three decades earlier, in 1876, constitutional monarchy had been established under Abdul Hamid during a period of time known as the First Constitutional Era, which lasted for only two years before Abdul Hamid suspended it and restored autocratic powers to himself.

The revolution began with CUP member Ahmed Niyazi's flight into the Albanian highlands. He was soon joined by İsmail Enver and Eyub Sabri. They networked with local Albanians and utilized their connections within the Salonica based Third Army to instigate a large revolt. Various coordinated assassinations by Unionist Fedai also contributed to Abdul Hamid's capitulation. With a Constitutionalist revolt in the Rumelian provinces instigated by the CUP, Abdul Hamid capitulated and announced the restoration of the Constitution, recalled the parliament, and called for elections.

After an attempted monarchist counterrevolution known as the 31 March Incident in favor of Abdul Hamid the following year, he was deposed and his brother Mehmed V ascended the throne.

Background 

Countering the conservative politics of Abdul Hamid II's reign was the amount of social reform that occurred during this time period. The development of a more modernized, liberal environment in Turkey strengthened the culture, and also provided the grounds for the later rebellion. Abdul Hamid's political circle was close-knit and ever-changing. When the sultan abandoned the previous politics from 1876, he suspended the Ottoman Parliament in 1878. This left a very small group of individuals able to partake in politics in the Ottoman Empire.

Young Turks Movement 

The origins of the revolution lie within the Young Turk movement, which wished to see Abdul Hamid's regime dismantled and reintroduce  the Constitution. Most Young Turk intellectuals were exiled, however many in the military held sympathies to the Young Turks. The Macedonian Conflict, a low intensity ethnic conflict in the Macedonian region revealed to many army officers stationed there the state was in need of drastic reform. While the Young Turks were in consensus that democratization was required for Ottomanism, the idea of national unity among the ethnic groups of the Ottoman Empire, they disagreed on further reform.

The Liberals, led by Prince Sabahattin (who was in exile in Switzerland) called for a more relaxed form of government as well as laissez faire economics. They also pushed for more autonomy of the different ethnic groups, which was popular among the minorities within in the Empire.

A more influential Young Turk faction organized under the Committee of Union and Progress (CUP), whose leader, Ahmed Rıza, was in exile in Paris. The Unionists wished for an Ottoman Empire dominated by Turks. From 1905, the CUP was able to infiltrate many institutions within the Ottoman government, most recruits being young officers of the Ottoman Third Army.

Revolution 
The event that triggered the Revolution was a meeting in the Baltic port of Reval between Edward VII of the United Kingdom and Nicholas II of Russia in June 1908. Though these imperial powers had experienced relatively few major conflicts between them over the previous hundred years, an underlying rivalry, otherwise known as "the Great Game", had exacerbated the situation to such an extent that resolution was sought. The Anglo-Russian Convention of 1907 brought shaky British-Russian relations to the forefront by solidifying boundaries that identified their respective control in Persia (eastern border of the Empire) and Afghanistan.

The defense of their shrinking state had become a matter of intense professional pride within the military which caused them to raise arms against their state. Many Unionist officers of the Ottoman Third Army based in Salonika (modern Thessaloniki), feared that the meeting was a prelude to the partition of Macedonia and mutinied against Sultan Abdul Hamid II. A desire to preserve the state, not destroy it, motivated the revolutionaries. The revolt began in July 1908. Major Ahmed Niyazi, Ismail Enver, Eyub Sabri, and other Unionists within the Third Army fled into the mountains to organize guerilla bands of volunteers and deserters all the while pressuring Abdul Hamid to reinstate the Constitution. The Committee threatened Hayri Pasha, field marshal of the Third Army, into passive cooperation, while also assassinating Şemsi Pasha, whom Abdul Hamid had sent to suppress the revolt in Macedonia. At this point, the mutiny which originated in the Third Army in Salonica took hold of the Second Army based in Adrianople (modern Edirne) as well as Anatolian troops sent from Izmir. The rapid momentum of the Unionist's organization, intrigues within the military, and discontent with Abdul Hamid's autocratic rule and a desire for the Constitution meant Abdul Hamid was alone and compelled to capitulate. Under pressure of being deposed, on July 24, 1908, Abdul Hamid capitulated and reinstated the Constitution to great jubilation.

July 24, 1908 started the Ottoman Empire's Second Constitution Era. Importantly, the CUP did not overthrow the government and nominally committed itself to democratic ideals and Constitutionalism. After the revolution, power was informally shared between the palace (Abdul Hamid), the Sublime Porte, and the CUP, whose Central Committee was still based in Salonica, and now represented a powerful deep state faction.

Historian Ronald Grigor Suny states that the revolution had no popular support and was actually "a coup d'état by a small group of military officers and civilian activists in the Balkans".

Aftermath 

The 1908 Ottoman general election took place during November and December 1908. The candidates backed by the CUP won 60 seats in the parliament. The Senate of the Ottoman Empire reconvened for the first time in over 30 years on 17 December 1908 with the living members like Hasan Fehmi Pasha from the First Constitutional Era. The Chamber of Deputies' first session was on 30 January 1909. These developments caused the gradual creation of a new governing elite.

Following the revolution, many organizations, some of them previously underground, established political parties. Among these the CUP and the Liberty (Ahrar) Party and later on Freedom and Accord, were the major ones. There were smaller parties such as Ottoman Socialist Party. On the other end of the spectrum were the ethnic parties which included; People's Federative Party (Bulgarian Section), Bulgarian Constitutional Clubs, Jewish Social Democratic Labour Party in Palestine (Poale Zion), Al-Fatat, and Armenians organized under Armenakan, Hunchakian and Armenian Revolutionary Federation (ARF).

While the Young Turk Revolution had promised organizational improvement, once instituted, the government at first proved itself rather disorganized and ineffectual. Although these working-class citizens had little knowledge of how to control a government, they imposed their ideas on the Ottoman Empire. In a small Liberal victory, Kâmil Pasha, a Liberal supporter and Anglophile, was appointed as the Grand Vizier on 5 August 1908. His policies helped to maintain some balance between the CUP and the Liberals, but conflict with the former led to his removal barely 6 months later, on 14 February 1909.

Abdul Hamid maintained his throne by conceding its existence as a symbolic position, but in April 1909 attempted to seize power (see 31 March Incident) by stirring populist sentiment throughout the Empire. The Sultan's bid for a return to power gained traction when he promised to restore the caliphate, eliminate secular policies, and restore the Sharia-based legal system. On 13 April 1909, army units revolted, joined by masses of theological students and turbaned clerics shouting, "We want Sharia", and moving to restore the Sultan's absolute power. The Action Army commanded by Mahmud Shevket Pasha reversed these actions and restored parliamentary rule after crushing the uprising on 24 April 1909. The deposition of Abdul Hamid II in favor of Mehmed V followed.

Two European powers took advantage of the chaos by decreasing Ottoman sovereignty in the Balkans. Bulgaria, de jure an Ottoman vassal but de facto all but formally independent, declared its independence on the 5th of October. The day after, Austria-Hungary officially annexed Bosnia and Herzegovina which used to be de jure Ottoman territory but de facto occupied by Austria-Hungary.

Cultural and international impact 
Hüseyin Hilmi Pasha's government signed into law the commemoration of the Young Turk Revolution and the second proclamation of the Constitution as a national holiday known as İyd-i Millî (National Holiday) in the Ottoman Empire and the Republic of Turkey. It was celebrated every July 23 starting in 1909, but the holiday decreased in importance due to Republic Day, the proclamation of the Turkish Republic on October 29, 1923. It stopped being celebrated as a national holiday by 1935.

In some communities, such as the Jewish (cf. Jews in Islamic Europe and North Africa and Jews in Turkey), reformist groups emulating the Young Turks ousted the conservative ruling elite and replaced them with a new reformist one.

Armenian Revolutionary Federation, previously outlawed, became the main representative of the Armenian community in the Ottoman Empire, replacing the pre-1908 Armenian elite, which had been composed of merchants, artisans, and clerics.

The revolution and CUP's work greatly impacted Muslims in other countries. The Persian community in Istanbul founded the Iranian Union and Progress Committee. The leaders of the Young Bukhara movement were deeply influenced by the Young Turk Revolution and saw it as an example to emulate. Indian Muslims imitated the CUP oath administered to recruits of the organization.

In popular culture 
In the 2010 alternate history novel Behemoth by Scott Westerfeld, the Young Turk Revolution in 1908 fails, igniting a new revolution at the start of World War I.

Gallery

See also

Iranian Constitutional Revolution
Charter of Alliance
Goudi Coup
March on Rome
Xinhai Revolution
Bourgeois revolution

References

Bibliography
 
 .
 
 
 .

External links
Proclamation of the Young Turks, 1908

Rebellions in Turkey
Protests in Turkey
1908 in the Ottoman Empire
Young Turks
20th-century revolutions
Ottoman Empire
July 1908 events
Conflicts in 1908